Yankee Stadium is a baseball stadium located in the Bronx, New York City. It is the home field of the New York Yankees of Major League Baseball, and New York City FC of Major League Soccer.

Opened in April 2009, the stadium replaced the original Yankee Stadium that operated from 1923 to 2008; it is situated on the  former site of Macombs Dam Park, one block north of the original stadium's site. The new Yankee Stadium replicates design elements of the original Yankee Stadium (including its exterior and trademark frieze), while incorporating larger spaces and modern amenities. It is the third-largest stadium in Major League Baseball by seating capacity.

Although construction began in August 2006, the project spanned many years and faced many controversies, including the high public cost and the loss of public parkland. The $2.3 billion stadium, built with $1.2 billion in public subsidies, is one of the most expensive stadiums ever built.

Along with baseball, the stadium has hosted soccer matches; in 2014, it became the home field of the new Major League Soccer expansion club New York City FC, which is owned by City Football Group and the Yankees. Yankee Stadium was intended to be an interim venue for the club until a soccer-specific stadium is constructed. It has also occasionally hosted neutral-site college football games, including the annual Pinstripe Bowl, as well as concerts and other events.

History

Planning
New York Yankees owner George Steinbrenner began campaigning for a new stadium in the early 1980s, just a few years after the remodeled Yankee Stadium opened. Steinbrenner at the time was reportedly considering a move to the Meadowlands Sports Complex in New Jersey. New Jersey Governor Thomas Kean in 1984 authorized the use of land for a new baseball stadium in the Meadowlands, but the state legislature did not provide financing for the stadium. In a statewide referendum in 1987, New Jersey taxpayers rejected $185 million in public financing for a baseball stadium for the Yankees. Despite the rejection from New Jersey, Steinbrenner frequently threatened to move as leverage in negotiations with New York City.

In 1988, Mayor Ed Koch agreed to have city taxpayers spend $90 million on a second renovation of Yankee Stadium that included luxury boxes and restaurants inside the stadium and parking garages and traffic improvements outside. Steinbrenner agreed in principle, but then backed out of the deal. In 1993, Mayor David Dinkins expanded on Koch's proposal by offering his Bronx Center vision for the neighborhood, including new housing, a new courthouse, and relocating the Police Academy nearby.

In 1993, New York Governor Mario Cuomo proposed using the West Side Yard, a  rail yard along the West Side of Manhattan and owned by the Metropolitan Transportation Authority, as the location for a new stadium for the Yankees. However, Cuomo lost his re-election bid a few months later. By 1995, Steinbrenner had rejected 13 proposals to keep the Yankees in the Bronx.

In 1998, Bronx Borough President Fernando Ferrer proposed spending $600 million in public money to add dozens of luxury boxes to the stadium, to improve highway and public transportation access, and to create a Yankee Village, with shops, restaurants, and a museum. Steinbrenner rejected this as well. That same year, Mayor Rudy Giuliani unveiled a plan to relocate the Yankees to the West Side Yard for a $1 billion stadium. However, with most of the funding coming from taxpayers, Giuliani tabled the proposal, fearing rejection in a citywide referendum. The West Side Stadium plan resurfaced in December 2001, and by January 2002, months after the September 11 attacks, Giuliani announced "tentative agreements" for both the New York Yankees and New York Mets to build new stadiums. He estimated that both stadiums would cost $2 billion, with city and state taxpayers contributing $1.2 billion.

Michael Bloomberg, who succeeded Giuliani as mayor in 2002, called the former mayor's agreements "corporate welfare" and exercised the escape clause in the agreements to back out of both deals, saying that the city could not afford to build new stadiums for the Yankees and Mets. Bloomberg said that Giuliani had inserted a clause in this deal that loosened the teams' leases with the city and would allow the Yankees and Mets to leave the city on 60 days' notice to find a new home elsewhere if the city backed out of the agreement. At the time, Bloomberg said that publicly funded stadiums were a poor investment. Bloomberg's blueprint for the stadium was unveiled in 2004, at the same time as the plan for the Mets' new stadium, Citi Field. The final cost for the two stadiums was more than $3.1 billion; taxpayer subsidies accounted for $1.8 billion.

Construction

Groundbreaking ceremonies for the stadium took place on August 16, 2006, the 58th anniversary of Babe Ruth's death, with Steinbrenner, Bloomberg, and then-Governor of New York George Pataki among the notables donning Yankees hard hats and wielding ceremonial shovels to mark the occasion. The Yankees continued to play in the previous Yankee Stadium during the 2007 and 2008 seasons while their new home stadium was built across the street. The community was left without parkland for five years.

During construction of the new stadium, a construction worker and avid Boston Red Sox fan buried a replica jersey of Red Sox player David Ortiz underneath the visitors' dugout with the objective of placing a "hex" on the Yankees, much like the "Curse of the Bambino" that had allegedly plagued the Red Sox long after trading Ruth to the Yankees. After the worker was exposed by co-workers, he was forced to help exhume the jersey. The Yankees organization then donated the retrieved jersey to the Jimmy Fund, a charity started in 1948 by the Red Sox' National League rivals, the Boston Braves, but long championed by the Red Sox and particularly associated with Ted Williams. The worker has since claimed to have buried a 2004 American League Championship Series program/scorecard, but has not said where he placed it. These attempts didn't have much effect upon the home team, though: the Yankees went on to win the 2009 World Series at the end of their first MLB season in the new stadium.

Features
The new stadium is meant to evoke elements of the original Yankee Stadium, both in its original 1923 state and its post-renovation state in 1976. The exterior resembles the original look of the 1923 Yankee Stadium. The interior, a modern ballpark with greater space and increased amenities, features a playing field that closely mimics the 1988–2008 dimensions of the old stadium. The current stadium features 4,300 club seats and 68 luxury suites.

Design and layout

The stadium was designed by the architectural firm Populous. The exterior was made from 11,000 pieces of Indiana limestone, along with granite and pre-cast concrete. It features the building's name V-cut and gold-leaf lettered above each gate. The interior of the stadium is adorned with hundreds of photographs capturing the history of the Yankees. The New York Daily News newspaper partnered with the Yankees for the exhibition "The Glory of the Yankees Photo Collection", which was selected from the Daily News collection of over 2,000 photographs. Sports & The Arts was hired by the Yankees to curate the nearly 1,300 photographs that adorn the building from sources including the Daily News, Getty Images, the Baseball Hall of Fame and Major League Baseball.

The seats are laid out similar to the original Yankee Stadium's stands, with grandstand seating that stretches beyond the foul poles, as well as bleacher seats beyond the outfield fences. The Field Level and Main Level comprise the lower bowl, with suites on the H&R Block Level, and the Upper Level and Grandstand Level comprising the upper bowl. Approximately  of the stadium's seating is in the lower bowl, the inverse from the original Yankee Stadium. 50,287 fans can be seated, with a standing room capacity of 52,325. The new stadium's seating is spaced outward in a bowl, unlike the stacked-tiers design at the old stadium. Over 56 suites are located within the ballpark, triple the amount from the previous stadium. Many lower-level seats are cushioned, while all seats are equipped with cupholders. To allow for the extra seating space, the stadium's capacity is reduced by more than 4,000 seats in comparison to the previous stadium.

Many design elements of the ballpark's interior are inspired by the original Yankee Stadium. The roof of the new facility features a replica of the frieze that was a trademark of the previous ballpark. In the original Yankee Stadium, a copper frieze originally lined the roof of the upper deck stands, but it was torn down during the 1974–75 renovations and replicated atop the wall beyond the bleachers. The new stadium replicates the frieze in its original location along the upper deck stands. Made of steel coated with zinc for rust protection, it is part of the support system for the cantilevers holding up the top deck and the lighting on the roof. The wall beyond the bleacher seats is "cut out" to reveal the  subway trains as they pass by, like they were in the original facility. A manually operated auxiliary scoreboard was built into the left and right field fences, in the same locations it existed in the pre-renovation iteration of the original Yankee Stadium. They were removed in favor of advertising signage prior to the 2022 season.

Between the exterior perimeter wall and interior of the stadium is the "Great Hall", a large concourse that runs between Gates 4 and 6. The Great Hall features a  LED (light-emitting diode) ribbon display as well as a 25' by 36' LED video display above the entrance to the ballpark from Daktronics, a company in Brookings, South Dakota.

Monument Park, which features the Yankees' retired numbers, as well as monuments and plaques dedicated to distinguished Yankees, has been moved from its location beyond the left field fences in the original Yankee Stadium to its new location beyond the center field fences at the new facility. Monument Park is now situated under the sports bar; black shades cover the monuments on the back wall during games to prevent interference with the vision of the batter. The new location of the monuments is meant to mirror their original placement in center field at the original pre-renovation Yankee Stadium, albeit when they were on the playing field. The transfer of Monument Park from the old stadium to the new stadium began on November 10, 2008. The first monuments were put in place on February 23, 2009. Yankees pitcher Mariano Rivera requested that the Yankees reposition the team's bullpen, as well as add a door to connect the Yankees' bullpen to Monument Park, in order to allow access to it by Yankee relievers. The organization complied with his request.

Field dimensions and playing surface

The field dimensions for the outfield fences have the same distance markers as the original facility prior to closing yet the dimensions are not identical. Due to the design of the right-field stands and the inclusion of an embedded manual scoreboard, the right-field wall is an average of  closer to home plate. At the old Yankee Stadium, the right field wall curved from the right-field corner to straightaway center, while at the new ballpark the fence takes a sharp, almost entirely straight angle. The dimensions in left field are substantially the same despite the presence of an embedded auxiliary scoreboard there as well. All these differences make the current Yankee Stadium more batter-friendly than the original one.

The field is made up of Kentucky bluegrass, the same surface as the previous stadium, which is grown on a  farm in Bridgeton, New Jersey.

Comparison with the 1923 stadium

Amenities and facilities

Yankee Stadium features a wide array of amenities. It contains 63% more space,  more in total, than the previous stadium, with wider concourses and open sight lines on concourses. Over 1,100 HD video monitors are placed within the stadium and approximately $10 million worth of baseball merchandise is housed within the ballpark.

The center field scoreboard, manufactured by Mitsubishi Diamond Vision, measures 59 x  and offers  of viewing area. It was the third-largest HD scoreboard in the world when it opened (behind the  board at newly renovated Kauffman Stadium and the new  board at the renovated Tokyo Racecourse). Since then, it has also been surpassed by what was the world's largest scoreboard at AT&T Stadium and the new scoreboard at the Philadelphia Phillies' Citizens Bank Park. Displaying  of video, the scoreboard can display four 1080p HD images simultaneously.

The Yankees clubhouse features 30,000 square feet (2,880 m2) of space, over 2.5 times the space of the clubhouse from the previous facility. The dressing area alone features  of space, with each locker equipped with a safety deposit box and touch-screen computer. The Yankees clubhouse features a weight room, training room, video room, and lounge area, while both teams' clubhouses have their own indoor batting cages. The Yankees' therapy room features a hydrotherapy pool with an underwater treadmill. The Yankees are believed to be the first team to chemically treat their uniforms, as well as the showering surfaces with an anti-bacterial agent that reduces the risk of infection.

The New York Yankees Museum, located on the lower level at Gate 6, displays a wide range of Yankees' memorabilia. A "Ball Wall" features hundreds of balls autographed by past and present Yankees, and there are plans to eventually add autographs for every living player who has played for the Yankees. The centerpiece of the museum is a tribute to Don Larsen's perfect game in the 1956 World Series, with a commemorative home plate in the floor and statues of Larsen pitching to Yogi Berra. Along with a facsimile of a current locker from the Yankees' clubhouse, fans can view the locker of the late Thurman Munson, which sat unoccupied in the previous stadium's Yankee clubhouse in honor of Munson.

The ballpark offers a wide choice of restaurants. There are 25 fixed concessions stands, along with 112 movable ones. A Hard Rock Cafe is located within the ballpark, but it is open to anyone at the 161st St. and River Ave. entrance year round. The Hard Rock Cafe at Yankee Stadium officially opened on March 30, 2009, and an opening ceremony took place on April 2, 2009. A steakhouse called NYY Steak is located beyond right field. Celebrity chefs will occasionally make appearances at the ballpark's restaurants and help prepare food for fans in premium seating over the course of the season. Above Monument Park is the Center Field Sports Bar, whose tinted black glass acts as the ballpark's batter's eye. After the 2016 season, the Yankees began doing updates to Yankee Stadium including the Masterpass Batter's Eye Deck and Frank's Red Hot Terrace and Toyota Terrace. The Masterpass Batter's Eye Deck above the Center Field Sports Bar is an outdoor gathering space in center field with clear full views of the playing field available to all ticketed guests. The Frank's Red Hot Terrace and Toyota Terrace overlook the visitors' and Yankees' bullpens respectively. The new AT&T Sports Lounge is behind section 134 on the main level and features a full bar, tables, stools and large screen TVs. The new Budweiser Party Decks located at sections 311 and 328 in the upper deck feature shaded standalone bar areas serving beer, cocktails and food. There is a new SunRun Kids Clubhouse located on the 300 level in right field and outfitted with Yankees-themed playground equipment. Ahead of the 2020 season, the Yankees added two new "social spaces"; the Stella Artois Landing at sections 232A and 232B in left field and the Michelob Ultra Clubhouse at sections 207 and 208 in right field. Both sections are available to fans with tickets anywhere in the Stadium.

Public opinion

Opening and public perception

Although Yankee Stadium has been praised for its amenities, it also has been widely criticized for high ticket prices. Seats within the first eight rows in the lower bowl, called the "Legends Suite", are among the highest-priced tickets in professional sports. Tickets cost $510 on average; the most expensive tickets cost $2,600 each. Legends Suite Seats have been regularly empty, with many ticket holders in this section having given up their tickets, and others remaining unsold, despite most other seats in the ballpark selling out. This has created an embarrassing image on television of the seats behind home plate being almost completely vacant. Consequently, a surplus of tickets for Legends Seats have emerged in the secondary market, and with supply exceeding demand, resale prices have dropped. Empty seats in the Legends Suite could even be seen during the 2009 playoffs, including World Series games. Even though all playoff games were sellouts, Legends Suite ticket holders were in the lounges and the restaurant underneath instead of their seats. Overall, the average ticket price is $63, the highest in baseball.

Legends Suite seats are also separate from the other lower bowl seating and are vigorously patrolled by stadium security, with the divider being described as a "concrete moat." Fans who do not have tickets within this premium section in the front rows are not allowed in the section. This includes standing behind the dugouts during batting practice and to seek autographs. The least expensive seats, the bleachers, initially left many fans disappointed, as the indoor club seating area in center field obstructed the views from bleacher seats on both sides in sections 201 and 239. These severely obstructed sections would ultimately be removed during the 2016–2017 off-season in favor of outdoor bars and patio called Franks Red Hot Terrace in left center and Toyota Terrace in right center. These new areas are complete with standing terraces accessible to all ticket holders, in addition to replacing the seating on top of the center field club with standing terraces, drastically reducing the number of obstructed views from center field in the process.

The Yankee Stadium staff was also criticized for an incident during a May 4, 2009 game, which was interrupted by a rain delay. Fans were told by some staff members that the game was unlikely to resume and consequently, many fans exited the stadium, only for the game to eventually resume play. The fans that left the ballpark were not permitted to re-enter, per the stadium's re-entry policy, and many subsequently got into arguments with stadium personnel. In response to the backlash the Yankees received for the incident, the staff members were required to sign a gag order preventing them from speaking to media, but they did indicate that communication for rain delays would be improved.

Late in the stadium's first season, cracks were seen on the concrete ramps of the Stadium. The Yankees are trying to determine whether there was something wrong with the concrete, or the ramps' installation or design. The company involved in inspecting the concrete was indicted on charges that its employees either faked or failed to perform some required tests and falsified the results of others.

The stadium has also been criticized for its lack of fan noise. During a Sunday Night Baseball telecast in 2012, commentator and former Red Sox manager Terry Francona spoke about the different atmospheres in the old and new stadiums saying that "As a visiting team, especially for the Red Sox, by the time the (national) anthem was over, you couldn't wait to get back in the dugout. Now (there is) a little different (kind) of fan sitting around down there by the dugout." Games at the new stadium do not feature the same deafening crowd moments and often sound eerily silent. The lack of fan noise was noticeable in the 2012 playoffs as well, with thousands of unsold seats for Game 5 of the ALDS and Games 1 and 2 of the ALCS. "This is a very easy place to play now," said Quintin Berry of the Detroit Tigers, the Yankees' ALCS opponents. "Coming from Oakland, the fans there were so rowdy. It was easier to come here." In his autobiography The Closer, the Yankees' longtime relief pitcher Mariano Rivera wrote about the new stadium's atmosphere: "It doesn't hold noise, or home-team fervor, anywhere near the way the old place did. The old Stadium was our 10th man—a loud and frenzied cauldron of pinstriped passion, with a lot of lifers in the stands. Maybe I'm wrong, but it's hard to see that the new place can ever quite duplicate that." Derek Jeter echoed this sentiment in a September 2014 article in New York magazine, in which he said he missed the original Yankee Stadium: "It was a different feel. The new stadium, it's second to none—all the amenities. For the players, it really doesn't get any better. The old stadium, if you were at the stadium, in the stands, the only place you could see the game was in your seat. Now there's so many suites and places people can go. So a lot of times it looks like it's empty, but it's really not. The old stadium, it was more intimidating. The fans were right on top of you."

Propensity for home runs

In its first season, Yankee Stadium quickly acquired a reputation as a "bandbox" and a "launching pad" because of the high number of home runs hit at the new ballpark.  Through its first 23 games, 87 home runs were hit at the venue, easily besting Enron Field's (now called Minute Maid Park) previous record set in 2000.  Early in the season, Yankee Stadium was on pace to break Coors Field's 1999 single-season record of 303 home runs allowed, and the hometown Daily News (using the back-page headline "HOMERS ODYSSEY") started publishing a daily graphic comparing each stadium's home run totals through a similar number of games.

ESPN commentator Peter Gammons denounced the new facility as "one of the biggest jokes in baseball" during an appearance on Mike and Mike in the Morning, and concluded that "[it] was not a very well-planned ballpark".  Likewise, Gammons' ESPN colleague Buster Olney described the stadium as "a veritable wind tunnel" and likened it to his childhood Wiffle-ball park.  Newsday columnist Wallace Matthews joined in the criticism, labeling the stadium "ridiculous" and accused "the franchise that took ownership of the home run" of cheapening it.  He suggested that Babe Ruth could have potentially hit 120 or more homers if he played in the new Stadium.  For his column, Matthews interviewed former Yankee Reggie Jackson, who termed the park "too small" to contain current player Alex Rodriguez.  Jackson estimated that the park might enable the third baseman to hit 75 home runs in a season.

A variety of theories have been posited to account for the dramatic increase in home runs at the new Yankee Stadium over the original stadium, foremost among these the sharper angles of the outfield walls and the speculated presence of a wind tunnel.  During construction of the new ballpark, engineers commissioned a wind study, the results of which indicated there would be no noticeable difference between the two stadiums.  The franchise planned a second study, but Major League rules prohibit a team from making any changes to the playing field until the off-season.

An independent study by the weather service provider AccuWeather in June 2009 concluded that the shape and height of the right field wall, rather than the wind, is responsible for the proliferation of home runs at the stadium.  AccuWeather's analysis found that roughly 20% of the home runs hit at the new ballpark would not have been home runs at the old ballpark due to the gentle curve of its right field corner, and its  wall height.  Nothing was observed in wind speeds and patterns that would account for the increase.

The number of home runs hit at the new stadium slowed significantly as the season progressed, but a new single-season record for most home runs hit at a Yankee home ballpark was nonetheless set in the Yankees' 73rd home game of 2009 when Vladimir Guerrero of the Los Angeles Angels of Anaheim hit the 216th home run of the season at the venue, surpassing the previous record of 215 set at the original Yankee Stadium in 2005. However, the Yankees offense, as in previous years, had employed many home run hitters in 2009. The Yankees hit 108 home runs while playing on the road, the second most in baseball behind the Philadelphia Phillies.

In 2010, the early rate of home runs were markedly less through May 15, 2010, with 35 home runs hit in 14 games for 2.5 per game (a projection of 205—in 2009, the stadium finished at 2.93 per game for a total of 237). Even though the stadium's home run rate decreased slightly for the 2010 season to 2.73 per game, it was still the highest figure in the majors. However, the prolific home run rate of April and May 2009 that drew criticism has not sustained itself over any season thus far, and while through the first two months of the 2011 season the Yankees hit far more homers than any other team in the majors, Yankee Stadium was not the top home run park.

Stadium firsts

Before the official Opening Day against the Cleveland Indians on April 16, 2009, the Yankees hosted a two-game exhibition series at the stadium in early April against the Chicago Cubs. Grady Sizemore of the Indians was the first player to hit a grand slam off of Yankee pitcher Dámaso Marte. The Indians and 2008 Cy Young Award winner Cliff Lee spoiled the opening of the new stadium by winning 10–2. Before the Yankees went to bat for the first time, the bat that Babe Ruth used to hit his first home run at the old Yankee Stadium in 1923 was placed momentarily on home plate. Jorge Posada hit the first Yankee home run in the new ballpark hitting his off Lee in the same game. Russell Branyan, while playing for the Seattle Mariners, was the first player to hit a home run off of the Mohegan Sun Restaurant in center field.

Like its predecessor, the new Yankee Stadium hosted the World Series in its very first season; in the 2009 World Series, the Yankees defeated the Philadelphia Phillies 4 games to 2. It also became the latest stadium to host a World Series-clinching victory by its home team in the venue's first season (after the St. Louis Cardinals won the World Series at Busch Stadium in 2006), when, on November 4, 2009, the Yankees won their 27th World Series championship against the Phillies. The Yankees are the only team to inaugurate two stadiums with World Series wins and also appeared in the 1976 World Series following the refurbishment of the original Yankee Stadium, losing to the Big Red Machine in four straight. On October 6, 2011 Detroit Tigers in game five of the ALDS were the first team to eliminate the Yankees at the new Yankee Stadium in the postseason.

Many historic milestones and records have been achieved at Yankee Stadium.  In 2009, Derek Jeter became the Yankees all-time hits leader with his 2,722nd hit, surpassing Lou Gehrig's 72-year record.  The following season, Alex Rodriguez hit his 600th home run at the Stadium, becoming the youngest player to accomplish the feat.  In 2011, three significant milestones were achieved at the stadium.  In July, Jeter became the first Yankee to join the 3,000 hit club and collect all 3,000 hits with the franchise.  The following month, the Yankees became the first team in history to hit three grand slams in a single game. As the regular season drew to a close, Mariano Rivera became the all-time leader in regular season saves, when he earned his 602nd save.

On April 20, 2016, the Oakland Athletics' Kendall Graveman became the first starting pitcher to bat at Yankee Stadium.

Due to the lack of games scheduled for teams not in the own league, San Diego Padres in the NL West was the final team to visit the Yankee Stadium in its new configuration on May 27, 2019. Yankees amassed a record of 24–5 for homes games against every opposing teams' first games visiting the current Yankee Stadium.

On June 25, 2022, new Yankee Stadium witnessed its first no-hitter when three Houston Astros pitchers (Cristian Javier, Héctor Neris, and Ryan Pressly) combine to no-hit the Yankees in a 3–0 win. The Astros were also the last team to no-hit the Yankees at the original Yankee Stadium in 2003.

Accessibility and transportation

It is also served by the Yankees – East 153rd Street station of the Metro-North Railroad, opened on May 23, 2009; this station routinely features Hudson Line train service, but on game days, Harlem Line and New Haven Line trains from upstate New York and Connecticut—as well as shuttle trains from Grand Central Terminal--also stop there. The stadium is also served by the Bx1, Bx2, Bx6, Bx6 SBS, and Bx13 New York City Bus routes.

Yankee Stadium is accessible by car via the Major Deegan Expressway (I-87), with connections to the Cross Bronx Expressway (I-95), Bruckner Expressway (I-278), and other highways and roads. Aside from existing parking lots and garages serving the stadium, construction for additional parking garages is planned. The New York State Legislature agreed to $70 million in subsidies for a $320 million parking garage project. On October 9, 2007, the New York City Industrial Development Agency approved $225 million in tax-exempt bonds to finance construction of three new parking garages that will have 3,600 new parking spaces, and renovation of the existing 5,569 parking spaces nearby. Plans initially called for a fourth new garage, but this was eliminated before the final approval. The garages will be built (and renovated) by the Community Initiatives Development Corporation of Hudson, a nonprofit entity that will use the parking revenue to repay the bonds and pay a $3 million yearly land lease to the City of New York. Parking is expected to cost $25 per game.

Non-baseball uses

Soccer
As part of the 2012 World Football Challenge, Chelsea played Paris Saint-Germain on July 22, 2012, in the first soccer match at Yankee Stadium, the match ended in a 1–1 tie, before a crowd of 38,202. The Stadium hosted another soccer match between A.C. Milan and Real Madrid on August 8, 2012. Real Madrid won 5–1, before a crowd of 49,474. Chelsea also played Manchester City there on May 25, 2013, which ended in a 5–3 win for City. On June 11, 2013, Spain defeated the Republic of Ireland 2–0 in a friendly match at the stadium.

On April 21, 2014, it was announced that New York City FC, a Major League Soccer expansion team owned jointly by the New York Yankees and Manchester City, would play in Yankee Stadium from 2015 until their new stadium is built. NYCFC played their first game at Yankee Stadium on March 15, 2015. Because of the unique dimensions of the Yankee Stadium field, the playing surface of the soccer pitch is 110 yards (100 m) long by 70 yards (64 m) wide—the smallest field in all of Major League Soccer, and close to the smallest allowed by International Football Association Board guidelines.

Despite having soccer matches played in Yankee Stadium, it is not approved for CONCACAF matches, most notability for the CONCACAF Champions League, meaning that any CONCACAF match that has New York City FC playing in it would be required to be played at another stadium.

International soccer matches

College football

The Notre Dame Fighting Irish played a college football game at Yankee Stadium against The Army Black Knights on November 20, 2010, with the Irish defeating the Black Knights 27–3. This marked the two teams' first meeting in the Bronx since 1969. Army played Rutgers in 2011 (Rutgers defeated Army 27–12), and played against Connecticut in 2014.  Also in 2014, Lehigh and Lafayette played the 150th edition of their college football rivalry game at Yankee Stadium on November 22, 2014. Both teams played to a sold out stadium; Lafayette winning, 27–7. On November 12, 2016, Fordham University beat Holy Cross 54–14 in the 53rd meeting of the Ram–Crusader Cup.

Since 2010, Yankee Stadium has hosted the Pinstripe Bowl, an annual college football bowl game. The inaugural bowl pitted Syracuse (3rd place Big East) against Kansas State (7th place Big 12) on December 30, 2010. Syracuse defeated Kansas State 36–34 in a shootout, before a crowd of 38,274.

The stadium was intended to host a game between Rutgers and Maryland on November 4, 2017. The game was moved back to Rutgers' home stadium due to potential conflicts with the Yankees' postseason.

Ice hockey
In 2014, the National Hockey League (NHL) hosted two outdoor games at Yankee Stadium known as the NHL Stadium Series, with the New Jersey Devils hosting the New York Rangers on January 26, 2014, and the New York Islanders hosting the Rangers on January 29, 2014. The Devils and Islanders had never played an outdoor game before this series. The Rangers were the designated away team in both games to maintain the tax-exempt status of their home arena, Madison Square Garden; if either the Rangers or the New York Knicks "cease playing" home games at the Garden, the venue would lose its tax exemption and be subject to penalties.

Concerts

Boxing
The promotional tour for the Manny Pacquiao–Miguel Cotto fight began with an event at Yankee Stadium on September 10, 2009.

On June 5, 2010, Yuri Foreman fought Cotto in the first boxing match in The Bronx since 1976. The fight was referred to as the "Stadium Slugfest". Cotto defeated Foreman with a TKO in the ninth round. Cotto captured the WBA super welterweight title and his fourth world title, before a crowd of 20,272.

Other events
The first non-baseball event at the current version of Yankee Stadium took place on the evening of Saturday, April 25, 2009, when Senior Pastor Joel Osteen of Lakewood Church held what was dubbed as a "Historic Night of Hope" Christian prayer service.

A New York University graduation ceremony took place on May 13, 2009, with the address being delivered by U.S. Secretary of State and former New York Senator Hillary Clinton. The 2010 NYU ceremony featured alumnus Alec Baldwin as a speaker. President Bill Clinton spoke at the 2011 ceremony. Taylor Swift received her honorary doctorate in fine arts at the 2022 ceremony.

In 2014, Yankee Stadium became the home of the Double A and Triple A New York City High School Public School Athletic League Championship. In 2011, it became home to the PSAL Football City Conference Championship.

Ticket policy 
Effective 2016, printed electronic tickets cannot be used at New York Yankees and New York City FC matches at Yankee Stadium. Only traditional hard-stock tickets, and those issued via a mobile ticketing system, are accepted. The team justified the decision by stating that it was meant to combat fraud associated with printed digital tickets. However, it was also believed that the team was trying to specifically hinder the ticket resale service StubHub, which competed against an official resale service run by TicketMaster known as the Yankees Ticket Exchange. The YTE is subject to a price flooring policy, meaning that tickets may only be discounted up to a certain amount. Although StubHub is the official ticket resale partner of Major League Baseball, the Yankees, as well as the Los Angeles Angels and Chicago Cubs, had opted out of this agreement.

Owing to the Yankees' ownership of the team, New York City FC announced on March 11, 2016, that its matches would also be subject to this policy. At the team's March 13, 2016 home opener, although the team stated that they would be phasing in mobile ticketing by introducing additional verification steps for printed tickets before the policy takes full effect in April, reports indicated that the stadium was turning away fans with printed tickets, leading to long queue lines, as well as few attendees inside the stadium itself. In an interview with WFAN radio, Yankees COO Lonn Trost explained that the measures were to help combat ticket resale, arguing that the team did not want fans to purchase "premium" seats at bargain prices, because they would be filled by "someone who has never sat in a premium location [before]".

On April 3, 2016, an episode of the HBO news-comedy series Last Week Tonight aired, where host John Oliver responded to Trost's remarks, arguing that he was "saying that rich people couldn't bear to sit next to people who aren't as rich." As a further satire of Trost's arguments against discounted resale, Oliver then announced a contest in which viewers were invited to send photos of themselves dressed as if they had "never sat in a premium location before", with winners offered the ability to purchase a pair of Legends Seats from one of the first three home games of the season for 25 cents. The stunt was successful, leading to the presence of several costumed attendees in Legends Seats during the opening games. Team president Randy Levine responded positively to the stunt, thanking Oliver for having bought tickets to begin with, and remarked that everyone was welcome at Yankee Stadium.

On June 27, 2016, the Yankees announced that it had reached a deal with StubHub for it to become its new official ticket resale partner beginning on July 7, 2016, and allow season ticket holders to sell electronic tickets, rather than mail physical tickets to the buyer. The service will still be subject to a price flooring policy, but the team stated that the new arrangement would provide a "superior, more secure, [and] better experience".

See also
 List of most expensive buildings in the world

References

External links

 
 Virtual tour of new Yankee Stadium 
 Newsday.com New Yankee Stadium
 Ballparks of Baseball
 Ballparks.com overview of proposed stadium
 Photographic Updates of the Construction of the New Yankee Stadium
 Metro-North Railroad station at Yankee Stadium
 Yankee Stadium Seating Chart
 Yankee Stadium at StadiumDB.com

 
 
American football venues in New York City
Baseball venues in New York City
Major League Baseball venues
Major League Soccer stadiums
NCAA bowl game venues
New York City FC
Soccer venues in New York City
College football venues
Sports venues in the Bronx
Sports venues completed in 2009
2009 establishments in New York City
Populous (company) buildings